Hero of Sparta is an action-adventure hack-and-slash video game developed by Spanish studio Gameloft Iberica and published by Gameloft; it was released for Java ME -based mobile phones, Android, iOS, Nintendo DS, and PlayStation Portable in 2008. A high-definition (HD) version was also released for some Android and Symbian devices and iOS. Both versions have been removed from the Google Play Store; the game is now only available for Android devices via Gameloft's official website. The game follows a storyline set in ancient Greece, wherein the player controls the protagonist throughout multiple landscapes while fighting mythical beasts. It game was moderately well-received by critics, and its 2D version was re-released in the late 2010s in two Gameloft Java game compilations: Gameloft Classics: Action and Gameloft Classics: 20 Years.

Gameplay
The game consists of eight levels (thirteen in the Java version and five in the DS version) in which the player controls a Spartan king wielding a sword, an unbreakable shield, Andromeda chains, Medusa's shield, Chronos' sword, etc. and fighting various mythical beasts. The player can collect different-colored orbs by defeating enemies, with each color corresponding to a different effect. Green orbs restore health, blue restore magical energy, and red orbs grant experience points that can be used to upgrade the damage and special powers of weapons found throughout the course of the game. In some versions of the game, upgrading weapons to their maximum capacities will cause them to take on an "ultimate" form.

The game features real-time events called "focus kills" that occur when certain enemies are nearly defeated. The player will be prompted to input a series of controls (or tap the screen) to perform a finishing blow on the enemy. Successful focus kills award the player with more orbs. In some cases, the player is required to perform focus kills to defeat bosses.

Plot

2D version

3D version
The story centers around the Spartan king Argos as he awakens on a beach shortly after his entire fleet of ships has been wiped out by a violent storm. While exploring the island, the spirit of an oracle apparently held in captivity pleads for Argos to rescue her. In exchange, the oracle offers to use her power to return Argos to his homeland.

Reception

The game has been directly compared to the God of War franchise, even being called "a shameless God of War rip-off."

Sequel
A sequel Hero of Sparta II was released on July 29, 2010 for Android and iOS; it follows Argos embarking on a new adventure after he returns to Sparta.

References

External links

2008 video games
Action-adventure games
DSiWare games
Gameloft games
IOS games
Android (operating system) games
PlayStation Network games
PlayStation Portable games
WebOS games
Symbian games
Video games developed in Spain
Video games set in antiquity
Video games based on Greek mythology
Vivendi franchises
J2ME games